Everything's Mellow is an album by trumpeter Clark Terry featuring performances recorded in 1961 and originally released on the Moodsville label.

Reception

Allmusic rated the album with three stars.

Track listing
 "Out in the Cold Again" (Rube Bloom, Ted Koehler) - 4:29
 "The Simple Waltz" (Bob Brookmeyer, Clark Terry) - 5:10
 "This Is Always" (Mack Gordon, Harry Warren) - 4:53
 "Lullaby" (Johannes Brahms) - 3:40
 "Among My Souvenirs" (Edgar Leslie, Horatio Nicholls) - 4:48
 "In the Alley" (Clark Terry) - 3:46
 "Michelle" (Terry) - 4:33 		
 "As You Desire Me" (Allie Wrubel) - 3:26

Personnel
Clark Terry - trumpet, flugelhorn
Junior Mance - piano
Joe Benjamin - bass
Charlie Persip - drums

References

Moodsville Records albums
Clark Terry albums
1961 albums
Albums recorded at Van Gelder Studio